Noel Granger (1931 – 11 June 2011) was an Australian wrestler. He competed in the men's freestyle welterweight at the 1956 Summer Olympics.

References

External links
 

1931 births
2011 deaths
Australian male sport wrestlers
Olympic wrestlers of Australia
Wrestlers at the 1956 Summer Olympics
Place of birth missing